The 2006–07 Canadian Interuniversity Sport women's ice hockey season began in October, ending with the 2007 CIS championship game in March, 2007. The tournament was won by the Alberta Pandas women's ice hockey program.

Player stats

Scoring leaders

Leading goal scorers

Goaltending leaders

Awards and honors
Brodrick Trophy, Lindsay McAlpine, Alberta Pandas
Rookie of the Year, Catherine Ward, McGill Martlets
Coach of the Year, Rheal Bordage, Moncton
Marion Hillard Award, Taryn Barry, Alberta Pandas

All-Canadian teams
First Team

Second Team

All-Rookie Team

CIS Playoffs

Pool A

Pool B

Finals

CIS Playoff All-Star team

References

External links
 The official site of CIS Women's Hockey Championship
  2007 CIS women's ice hockey Championship

See also
Canadian Interuniversity Sport women's ice hockey championship
2011–12 Canadian Interuniversity Sport women's ice hockey season
2009–10 Canadian Interuniversity Sport women's ice hockey season

 
U Sports women's ice hockey seasons
2